The following is a list of episodes for the Australian version of the improvisational television comedy series Thank God You're Here.



Series One (5 April 2006 - 7 June 2006)

Series One Guest stars
Guests include various Australian personalities, usually with a comedy/acting background.

Series One Episode overview

Episode 1: 5 April 2006

Episode 2: 12 April 2006

Episode 3: 19 April 2006

Episode 4: 26 April 2006

Episode 5: 3 May 2006

^ This is the first time there has ever been a tie between two winners in one night.

Episode 6: 10 May 2006

Episode 7: 17 May 2006

Episode 8: 24 May 2006

^Note: All the heroes' names and powers, plus the villain's name were coined by the contestants. (They were asked who they were and who the villain was)

Episode 9: 31 May 2006

Episode 10: 7 June 2006

^While Kate Langbroek and Akmal Saleh when through the door, Shaun Micallef and Angus Sampson went to two green rooms on both sides of the set, Frank Woodley headed into a helicopter outside the studio which then took him up above the studio to do his segment.

Series Two (6 September 2006 - 8 November 2006)

Series Two Guest stars

Series Two Episode overview

Episode 1: 6 September 2006

Episode 2: 13 September 2006

Episode 3: 20 September 2006

^ Contrary to popular belief, this was not the first time a member of the ensemble cast did not say "Thank God you're here" at the start of the scene. Lines similar (but not identical) to the title of the show have been used in scenes before, such as "Thank the Lord you're here" and "Thank the gods you're here". However, this was the first time the guest entered the scene without using one of the trademark blue wooden doors. Instead, Matthew Newton was escorted around the back of the set by host Shane Bourne, and he entered through a curtain (which, when viewed from the front, made him look like he was emerging from the car which was half-embedded in the wall of the set). The first words spoken were, "Thank God you're alive!"

+ For this final scene, Ryan Shelton was placed elsewhere (presumably out the back or to the side in the studio) with four kids who looked around 4–5 years old.

Episode 4: 27 September 2006

Episode 5: 4 October 2006

Episode 6: 11 October 2006

^ The first time that a Guest Performer says the line "Thank God You're Here". Josh Lawson knocked on the door as he was about to walk through and then when entering he quipped "Thank god you're here, I was knocking for hours."

Episode 7: 18 October 2006

^ Featured Australian personalities Alan Fletcher (Neighbours' Dr Karl), Kimberley Davies and Matt Welsh on the Miss Universe judging panel. This episode was also advertised as an 'international episode' that would feature a Turk, a yank, and two kiwis.

† Tony Martin went through the regular door but, had to be let in through a window by the ensemble cast members in the scene.

Episode 8: 25 October 2006

^ Jimeoin had to go around the side and crawl through to the scene.

Episode 9: 1 November 2006

^ Once again, Matthew Newton was led around to the back of the centre set, and started the scene coming down the emergency slide to appear like coming from the plane wreckage.

† Featured special appearance by Australian Idol judge Mark Holden.

Episode 10: 8 November 2006

^ Instead of opening the door, Julia went behind the set and was asked to wait for the doors to be slide open to look alike a "This Is Your Life" entrance. Featured special appearances by Play School presenter Simon Burke as the host and former Perfect Match host Greg Evans.

† Instead of opening the door, an ensemble cast member dressed as a SWAT officer smashes the door for Tony.

~ Instead of opening the door, Frank climbed through a tunnel leading to the doors under the helm of the ship.

Series Three (11 July 2007 - 26 September 2007)

Series Three Guest stars

Series Three Episode overview

Episode 1: 11 July 2007

^ Instead of opening the door, Lawson was led to the back of the set to climb through a gap in the wall which led to the door of a spaceship.

Episode 2: 18 July 2007

^ Hamish Blake and Merrick Watts were in drag for this scene.

Episode 3: 25 July 2007

¹ This scene also featured Nikki Webster as one of the characters.

² Instead of going through the door, Eddie was led backstage by a cast member dressed as a stagehand and entered through an entryway, to make it look like he was appearing onto the set.

³ Before entering, Shaun tried pulling host Shane Bourne into the scene rather forcibly. Shane would bring this up again in Episode 11, when Shaun made his next appearance.

Episode 4: 1 August 2007

Episode 5: 8 August 2007

^ Instead of entering through the door, the performers entered through the back on a bobsleigh which glided into the set.

Episode 6: 15 August 2007

^ Instead of walking through the door, Nish had to sit down at a table by the stage with his ensemble partner, to appear as though they were at the awards show.

Episode 7: 22 August 2007

^ Instead of walking through the door, Barron had to walk through the back to appear as if he had come through the bush.

Note: Due to the Australian Idol 2007 semi-finals, no new episode was screened on 29 August 2007 in the next scheduled week.

Episode 8: 5 September 2007

^ Kate entered via the back of the set to look as though she had come up some stairs within her house.  This scene also featured Mick Molloy as a performer.

Episode 9: 12 September 2007

^ Instead of walking through the door, Peter was restrained and was wheeled in the scene by a cast member dressed as a henchman.

Episode 10: 19 September 2007

^ Instead of walking through the door, Sean entered via a children's tube slide which he slid down on into the set. Tom Gleisner said he would give Sean bonus points if he exited the scene the same way he entered - back up the tube. Shane Bourne told Sean to go ahead, but Sean said "after you", resulting in Shane climbing up the tube as well. This is one of the very rare times Shane gets involved with the set.

³ Featured Matt Welsh as a guest performer.

Episode 11: 26 September 2007

^ - Anh emerged from behind the studio audience and walked on stage via a runway, similar to the evicted housemates  on the Big Brother Australia eviction shows.

³ - Featured The Veronicas as guest performers

Series Four (29 April 2009 - 8 July 2009)

Series Four Guest stars

^ An "Extra-Honourable" mention (Episode 7).

Series Four Episode overview

Episode 1: 29 April 2009

^ Instead of walking through the door, Rhys had to walk through the back to appear as if he had come out of the misty darkness.

Episode 2: 6 May 2009

^ Instead of walking through the door, Hamish came through the back, a castle hallway adjacent to a dungeon, while riding his horse.† Instead of walking through the door, Josie came through the back, as to appear as if she had hopped out of the door of a limousine.~ Featured Damien Fleming as a guest performer.§ After walking through the door, Peter followed a hidden corridor to the back of set to appear as if emerging from inside a tent.# After walking through the door, Rob had to walk down a hidden corridor which then lead to hospital style double-hinged doors which he walked through.≈ Josie's segment was done in front of a green-screen. Peter's segment was done from the front yard of a real house opposite the Melbourne Showgrounds entrance gate.
Rob's scenario was actually filmed 2nd, and Josie's was filmed 4th.  The segment order was switched in the broadcast show.

Episode 3: 13 May 2009

^ Instead of walking through the door, Angus followed a hidden corridor to the back of the set to appear as if emerging from an elevator. 
† Featured Melissa Tkautz as a guest performer. 
~ Instead of walking through the door, Dave entered later in the scene from the back of the set, riding a miniature motocross bike.

Episode 4: 20 May 2009

^ Instead of walking through the door, Julia followed a hidden corridor to the back of the set to appear as if she was disembarking from a train.
† Instead of walking through the door, Carl got behind the wheel of a mock Formula One racing car, which was then guided onto the set.
~ Instead of walking through the door, Tom followed a hidden corridor to the back of the set to appear as if he was disembarking from an Air Force cargo aircraft.

Episode 5: 27 May 2009

^ Instead of walking through the door, Tony followed a hidden corridor to the back of the set to appear as if climbing down a ladder from the ground level to the mine.

Episode 6: 10 June 2009

Episode 7: 17 June 2009

^ Instead of walking through the door, Josh followed a hidden corridor to the back of the set to appear as if climbing down a ladder in the submarine, then stepping over the raised entrance & began the scenario.
 This is the first episode ever to feature more than one female guest.

Episode 8: 24/25 June 2009
Note: This episode aired on 24 June in Melbourne, Adelaide and Perth. It aired on 25 June 2009 in Sydney and Brisbane.

^ -  Anh had to enter through a back door due to the size of his costume.

Episode 9: 1 July 2009

Episode 10: 8 July 2009

Thank God You're Here